Jari Pekka Kurri (born May 18, 1960) is a Finnish former professional ice hockey player. Beginning in 1980, he played right wing for five National Hockey League (NHL) teams: the Edmonton Oilers, the Los Angeles Kings, the New York Rangers, the Mighty Ducks of Anaheim, and the Colorado Avalanche. Kurri played 17 seasons in the NHL and was the first Finnish player to be enshrined into the Hockey Hall of Fame, in 2001. He was a member of a Stanley Cup–winning team five times, all with the Oilers. He is perhaps best remembered as Wayne Gretzky's foil. In 2017, Kurri was named one of the '100 Greatest NHL Players' in history.

Kurri is the general manager and owner of Jokerit.

Playing career

Early years (1977–1980)
He began his pro career with Jokerit in the Finnish SM-liiga. After an eleven-point rookie season for Jokerit in 1977–78, Kurri scored 30 and 39 points the next two years, playing all 33 games in each season.

On March 20, 1979, in a game of seemingly minor consequence at the time, Kurri accompanied the Finnish national team to play in Edmonton, Alberta. The Finns had been invited by the World Hockey Association to play the WHA-leading Edmonton Oilers - while essentially an exhibition game for the Finnish team, the WHA counted the game in its standings. Finland lost the game 8-4, nevertheless Kurri impressed Oilers' management. His performance in Edmonton that night would have a profound impact on his later career.

Edmonton Oilers (1980-1990)

After his third professional season, Kurri was eligible for the 1980 NHL Entry Draft. However, he was also widely believed to still be liable for military service in NHL circles, and thus was ignored by most NHL teams. The Oilers, who had joined the NHL after the WHA merged following the 1978-79 season, had closely tracked Kurri's career after watching him play in Edmonton. They made discreet inquiries to the Finnish government and were able to determine that Kurri had already fulfilled his military service obligations. Taking advantage of this information, the Oilers waited until the fourth round before selecting Kurri with the 69th overall pick. Kurri remains regarded as one of the greatest "steals" in the history of the NHL draft.

When Kurri joined the Oilers, he was soon paired with Wayne Gretzky. Kurri and Gretzky became one of the most prolific scoring duos ever to play in the NHL. Despite not always playing on the same line, Gretzky assisted on 364 of Kurri's 601 career goals, while Kurri had an assist on 196 Gretzky goals.

During his career in Edmonton, he was nicknamed the "Finnish Flash" (a title since bestowed on Teemu Selänne). Kurri was "by far our most complete player", according to Oilers' director of personnel Barry Fraser. Although Kurri never won the Selke Trophy, he was regarded as one of the best defensive forwards in the NHL. Alongside Kurri, Esa Tikkanen and Gretzky, Edmonton had future hall-of-famers Paul Coffey, Grant Fuhr, Glenn Anderson and Mark Messier. The team won four Stanley Cups during Gretzky's tenure. In 1988, Gretzky was traded, along with team enforcer Marty McSorley, to the Los Angeles Kings. Following Gretzky's trade, Kurri recorded 195 points in 154 games, leading the Oilers to their fifth and last Stanley Cup in 1990.

Kurri won five Stanley Cups, all with Edmonton (1984, 1985, 1987, 1988 and 1990). In 1984–85 he had 135 points and scored 50 goals in his first 50 games; however, his 50th game was the Oilers' 53rd game so it does not count as an official 50 goals in 50 games. A year later, he led the league in goals with 68. In 1984–85 Kurri set a record for goals by a right winger when he scored 71, which was broken by Brett Hull when he scored 72 goals in 1989–90 (Hull's 86 goals in 1990–91 is the current record). Kurri also scored the Stanley Cup winning goal in game seven against the Philadelphia Flyers in 1987.

Kurri's 19 goals in the 1985 post-season (18 games played) tied an NHL record set by the Flyers' Reggie Leach in the 1976 playoffs (16 games played). Those 19 goals included four hat tricks, a still-standing record in a playoff season. Kurri scored three of the hat tricks against the Blackhawks in the conference finals, also a feat that no player has ever equaled. He scored five goals in a single game, on November 19, 1983. The achievement was not repeated by Finnish player until November 24, 2018 when Patrik Laine had a five-goal-game. Kurri registered three goals and two assists in Game 2 of the Stanley Cup Finals in Boston, May 18, 1990, setting a record for scoring in a single Finals game in the modern era, on his 30th birthday. Kurri had also set up Petr Klíma's goal in triple overtime in Game 1.

Later career (1990–1998)
Kurri's contract with the Oilers expired in 1990 but his NHL rights were still owned by the Oilers. Instead of accepting a new contract from the Oilers, Kurri opted for a season in Italy and played for Devils Milano of the Italian Serie A. Kurri had 27 goals and 48 assists in 30 games while he played in the Italian league.

After a season in Italy, Kurri's rights were traded to the Philadelphia Flyers and then to the Los Angeles Kings on the same day. For the first time since the 1988 trade, Kurri was reunited with Wayne Gretzky. The pair had a fairly successful campaign in 1993 leading the Los Angeles Kings to the Stanley Cup Finals where they faced off against the Montreal Canadiens. Kurri managed to put together 17 points in 24 games during the run, in which the Kings ultimately fell short and lost the series in 5 games. Jari followed the run up with a few more solid seasons as a Los Angeles King, scoring 146 points in 176 games; his decline in scoring was primarily due to his transition into a more defensive minded forward in a somewhat reduced role. (Though they were back on the same team, by this time he and Gretzky were not usually playing on the same line.)

Kurri's best season for the Kings was during the successful 1992–93 season when Kurri posted 27 goals and 60 assists in 82 games.

During the 1994–95 NHL lockout Jari Kurri represented Jokerit, the team for which he played before his NHL career. Kurri played alongside Teemu Selänne, the 1993 winner of the Calder Memorial Trophy who had established himself as one of the top stars in Finland during early success in the NHL. Kurri had one memorable moment during his visit to SM-liiga when Jokerit faced their local rivals HIFK. Kurri played against his former Oilers-linemate Esa Tikkanen and another Finnish NHL-player, Christian Ruuttu. Kurri, Selänne and Jokerit captain Waltteri Immonen led Jokerit to 4–2 victory over Russian HC Lada Togliatti in 1994 European Cup Finals.

After the lockout Kurri returned to Los Angeles, but was traded to New York Rangers in 1996 for their playoff run.

Kurri played the remainder of the 1995–96 NHL season with the Rangers and posted one goal and four assists in 14 games. While he may not have put up the points the Rangers expected him to at the end of the regular season, Kurri proved some of his value by notching 8 points in 11 playoff games with the Rangers.

After his short period with the Rangers, Kurri signed with the Mighty Ducks of Anaheim. Kurri intended to play alongside Teemu Selänne and Paul Kariya, but was ultimately reduced to a smaller role on the second and third lines, despite a newfound confidence from rigorous summer training. The Mighty Ducks made it to the playoffs and defeated the Phoenix Coyotes in the first round but were swept by the Detroit Red Wings in the second round.

After his single season with the Mighty Ducks, Kurri was signed by the Colorado Avalanche, the 1996 Stanley Cup champions. Kurri had a more defensive role with the Avalanche. Kurri's highlight of the season was his 600th NHL career goal, which he scored during a regular season game between the Avalanche and the Kings. Despite having a strong team with players like Joe Sakic, Peter Forsberg and Patrick Roy, the Avalanche were eliminated quickly in the playoffs by the Oilers.

Legacy
Kurri finished his career as the highest scoring European-born-and-trained player in NHL history, with 601 goals, 797 assists, and 1,398 points. (Stan Mikita, who was born in Slovakia, but raised in Canada, retired 18 seasons before Kurri with 926 assists and 1,467 points.) Kurri has since been passed in all three categories by Jaromír Jágr, who also passed all of Mikita's marks. Kurri has since also been bested in goals by Teemu Selänne (the current record-holder for NHL goals scored by a Finn), and in assists by Nicklas Lidström. He was also the highest ranked non-Canadian in NHL points and goals; the only non-Canadian with more assists at Kurri's retirement was American Phil Housley, since passed by Mike Modano. Kurri finished with 106 career playoff goals and 233 playoff points, third all-time behind Gretzky and Messier. His 1,398 points are 19th all-time, and the third highest among players trained in Europe behind Jágr and Selänne. He is 18th in all-time goals with 601, and was the leading Finn in that department until Selänne passed him in 2010. He is the second leading point-scorer in Oilers history, with 1,043 points in 754 games, behind Gretzky. His No. 17 has been retired by the Edmonton Oilers, the Finnish national team, and Jokerit. In addition, the Jari Kurri trophy is given to the most valuable player in the SM-liiga playoffs. In 2000, he was named along with longtime linemate Gretzky to the International Ice Hockey Federation Hall of Fame. In 1998, he was ranked number 50 on The Hockey News''' list of the 100 Greatest Hockey Players, the highest-ranking Northern European player (1998). In addition, he was the first Finn to be inducted into the Hockey Hall of Fame, doing so in 2001.

International play

Kurri also had a lengthy international career for the Finnish national team. Kurri debuted during 1980 Winter Olympics when Finland played in the Olympic ice hockey tournament. Kurri scored two goals and an assist in his international debut.

Since NHL players were unable to participate in the Winter Olympics and World Championships, Kurri's national team appearances were limited after he started his NHL career. Kurri was part of Finnish national team during 1981 Canada Cup. Finland lost four games and had a 4–4 tie with the United States. Kurri had a disappointing performance, with only one assist in five games.

After the Oilers were eliminated in the 1982 NHL playoffs, Kurri was able to join the Finnish national team in 1982 World Championships. The tournament was held in Finland. Kurri formed Finland's top line along with SM-liiga players Reijo Leppänen of TPS and Kari Jalonen of Kärpät. The lineup led the Finnish team in points and played well during the tournament but Finland was not able to advance to the medal round.

Kurri was part of the Finnish team at the 1987 Canada Cup and the 1989 World Championships, but Finland was unable to gain success on those tournaments, ranking 6th of 6 and 5th of 8, in those respective tournaments.

In 1991, Kurri represented Finland at the 1991 World Championships held again in Finland. Finland ranked 5th of 8 teams. Later that year, at the 1991 Canada Cup, Finland lost 3–7 to the United States in the semi-finals.

At the 1994 World Championships, Kurri managed to get his first international medal when Finland earned silver after losing 1–2 in a shootout against Canada.

At the 1998 Winter Olympics, Kurri faced Gretzky on ice for the last time, when Finland and Canada played for the Olympic bronze medal in Nagano. Finland was the underdog against Canada, but Finland won the game 3–2. Kurri scored the first goal of the game, which turned out to be his last goal for the Finnish national team.

After retirement
After being long time general manager of the Finnish national men's ice hockey team, scouting players and assisting the head coach. He is now GM of the first Finnish KHL league team Jokerit. In the summer of 2019, Hjallis Harkimo sold the Jokerit to Jari and so Jari Kurri now owns the club.

Personal life
Kurri is married to former Miss Finland, Vanessa Kurri, nee Forsman; they wed in 2004 and have three daughters: Odessa (born 2002), Alissa (born 2005) and Isla (2012), and one son, Paulus (born 2007). Kurri also has twin boys (Joonas and Ville) from his first marriage, to Tiina Kurri. Former linemate Wayne Gretzky is the godfather of Kurri's children from his first marriage.

Kurri is the godfather of Sami Lepistö.

Transactions
May 30, 1991 – Traded by the Edmonton Oilers, along with Dave Brown and Corey Foster, to the Philadelphia Flyers in exchange for Craig Fisher, Scott Mellanby and Craig Berube.
May 30, 1991 – Traded by the Philadelphia Flyers, along with Jeff Chychrun to Los Angeles Kings in exchange for Steve Duchesne, Steve Kasper and Los Angeles' 1991 4th round draft choice.
March 14, 1996 – Traded by the Los Angeles Kings, along with Shane Churla and Marty McSorley, to the New York Rangers in exchange for Ray Ferraro, Ian Laperrière, Nathan LaFayette, Mattias Norström and New York's 1997 4th round draft choice.
September 10, 1996 – Signed as a free agent with the Mighty Ducks of Anaheim.
September 15, 1997 – Signed as a free agent with the Colorado Avalanche.

Career statistics
Regular season and playoffs

^ Led leagueIn bold are NHL record(s) (tied with Reggie Leach)''

International

Achievements
NHL

SM-Liiga

International

See also
 50 goals in 50 games
 List of members of the Hockey Hall of Fame
 Hockey Hall of Fame
 List of NHL statistical leaders
 List of NHL players with 1000 points
 List of NHL players with 500 goals

References

External links
 }

1960 births
Living people
Colorado Avalanche players
Edmonton Oilers draft picks
Edmonton Oilers players
Finnish expatriate ice hockey players in Canada
Finnish expatriate ice hockey players in Italy
Finnish expatriate ice hockey players in the United States
Finnish ice hockey right wingers
Hockey Hall of Fame inductees
Ice hockey players at the 1980 Winter Olympics
Ice hockey players at the 1998 Winter Olympics
IIHF Hall of Fame inductees
International Olympic Committee members
Jokerit players
Lady Byng Memorial Trophy winners
Los Angeles Kings players
Medalists at the 1998 Winter Olympics
Mighty Ducks of Anaheim players
National Hockey League All-Stars
National Hockey League players with retired numbers
New York Rangers players
Olympic bronze medalists for Finland
Olympic ice hockey players of Finland
Olympic medalists in ice hockey
Serie A (ice hockey) players
Ice hockey people from Helsinki
Stanley Cup champions